White Rock is a cliff with an  summit located in Sublette County of  Wyoming, United States.

Description 
This geographical feature is part of the remote Wind River Range and is situated six miles west of the Continental Divide. It is set in the Bridger Wilderness, on land managed by Bridger-Teton National Forest. It is between Flat Top Mountain, 2.3 miles to the north-northeast, and Squaretop Mountain, 2.65 miles to the south. The iconic view of White Rock and Squaretop Mountain from Green River Lakes has been on the Wyoming licence plate since 2016.

Geology 
The mountain is composed of sedimentary rock that was laid down up to 450 million years ago in an ancient sea. The uppermost stratum is 300 million-year-old Madison Limestone, where seashell fossils are common. The cliff-forming limestone overlays a broken band of Darby Formation, which in turn overlays cliff-forming Bighorn Dolomite. The once sea-level strata were uplifted during the Laramide orogeny. Obsidian chippings have been found near the summit, suggesting the first ascent was possibly made by Native Americans.

Climate 
According to the Köppen climate classification system, White Rock is located in an alpine subarctic climate zone with long, cold, snowy winters, and cool to warm summers. Due to its altitude, it receives precipitation all year, as snow in winter, and as thunderstorms in summer. Precipitation runoff from the mountain drains into the Green River.

Hazards

Encountering bears is a concern in the Wind River Range. There are other concerns as well, including bugs, wildfires, adverse snow conditions and nighttime cold temperatures.

Importantly, there have been notable incidents, including accidental deaths, due to falls from steep cliffs (a misstep could be fatal in this class 4/5 terrain) and due to falling rocks, over the years, including 1993, 2007 (involving an experienced NOLS leader), 2015 and 2018. Other incidents include a seriously injured backpacker being airlifted near Squaretop Mountain in 2005, and a fatal hiker incident (from an apparent accidental fall) in 2006 that involved state search and rescue. The U.S. Forest Service does not offer updated aggregated records on the official number of fatalities in the Wind River Range.

Gallery

See also
 List of mountain peaks of Wyoming

References

External links 
 Weather forecast: National Weather Service

Bridger–Teton National Forest
Mountains of Sublette County, Wyoming
Mountains of Wyoming
North American 3000 m summits